The 2009–10 Serie A (known as the Serie A TIM for sponsorship reasons) was the 108th season of top-tier Italian football, the 78th in a round-robin tournament. There were three promoted teams from the Serie B, replacing the three teams that were relegated following the 2008–09 season. Nike provided a new match ball – the T90 Ascente – for this season. Following the season, citing a larger television contract, the seventeen teams that survived the season and the three promoted sides formed a new league akin to England's Premier League.

The title race was only settled on the last day of the season. The title was won by Internazionale, their fifth title in a row. Inter would go on to complete the first and only treble by an Italian team by winning the Coppa Italia and Champions League.

Teams
The following 20 teams participated in the 2009–10 season:

Personnels and Sponsoring

Managerial changes

 Davide Ballardini was removed from his managerial duties on 5 June, contemporarily to Walter Zenga's appointment as new head coach. He successively rescinded his contract by mutual consent on 13 June.
 Gennaro Ruotolo had originally accepted to stay at Livorno as a permanent head coach after he guided the team to success through the Serie B promotion playoffs in June 2009. However, on 9 July the Technical Sector of the Italian Football Federation announced Ruotolo could not serve as head coach in the Serie A, as he was lacking the required UEFA Pro coaching badges. Following these events, UEFA Pro licensed coach Vittorio Russo was appointed as head coach, with Ruotolo actually serving as joint head coach to him despite appearing as assistant manager to Russo himself. He was successively removed from his assistant coaching post on 20 September.
 Siena Primavera (under-19 team) coach Marco Baroni was appointed permanent first team coach on 29 October, only to be moved back to his previous role on 23 November.
 Gennaro Ruotolo was allowed to act as head coach without having the required UEFA Pro coaching badges only after having received temporary dispensation from the Italian Football Federation for a 60-day period.
 Youth team coach Giorgio Melis was allowed to act as caretaker without having the required UEFA Pro coaching badges after receiving temporary dispensation from the Italian Football Federation for a 60-day period.

The list does not include Serse Cosmi's resignation from Livorno on 24 January 2010, as it was rejected by the club two days later following a meeting between Cosmi and club chairman Aldo Spinelli, with no competitive game scheduled in between the short vacancy period.

League table

Results

Top goalscorers

Number of teams by region

References

External links

 2009–10 Serie A Season at RSSSF
2009–10 Serie A Season at ESPN 

Serie A seasons
Italy
1